A. C. Bearss was an assemblyman. As a Unionist, he was elected member of the Nevada Assembly, where he represented Nye County, on November 8, 1864. Bearss' term started the following day and after serving in a regular session he was re-elected on November 7, 1865. After serving in another regular session, his second term ended in November 1866. Bearss was succeeded by James M. Groves and W. T. Jones.

Bearss' opponent in the 1864 election, Democrat John Booth, owned a newspaper, called The Advertiser. In that newspaper, Booth published editorials, in which he defamed Bearss, before the election. As revenge, Bearss' friends stole the lever of Booth's press, but Booth continued publishing the newspaper with defaming editorials. Despite these editorials, Bearss managed to win the election.

References 

Nevada Unionists
Members of the Nevada Assembly
Year of birth missing
Year of death missing
People from Nye County, Nevada
19th-century American politicians